The DeYoung Family Zoo is a zoo that opened to the public in 1990. It is open yearly from May until the end of October. The zoo is owned by Bud DeYoung and Carrie Cramer. The facility has many exotic felines, and provides visitor interactions, as well as baby animals to pet and bottle feed.

Animals
The zoo's most popular attractions are tigers, leopards, lions, a liger and a hippopotamus.   
There are also Russian grizzly bears, mountain lions, wolves, zorilla, marbled polecats, kinkajou, coyotes, Bennett wallabies, ring-tailed lemurs, white Bengal tigers, a wild mustang, coatis, camels, yak, white-fronted capuchin, binturong, chimpanzee, spotted hyenas, striped hyenas, boa constrictors, Burmese pythons, anaconda, many different kinds of lizards, mouflon sheep (Petunia), lanner falcon, crested porcupines, black bears, alligators (that the owners swim with and catch on the weekends in the summer), spider monkeys, bobcats, badgers, emus, red kangaroo, New Guinea singing dogs, olive baboons, black-backed jackals, lynx, Arctic foxes, ducks, geese, chickens, rabbits, palm civets, tortoises, pine martens, fennec fox, albino raccoon, and red fox.

DeYoung and Cramer also participate in rehabilitation of local species of animals including white-tailed deer, raccoons, and anything else that needs help. In 2008, the zoo successfully bred two endangered Siberian tigers, which produced a litter of four.

Attractions
Attractions include a petting zoo full of domestic animals to meet and feed, with more than 400 animals from all over the world. Visitors can watch the zoo animal programs and animal feeding. 
The zoo offers hands on education and animal education programs. The park strives to educate the public on animal issues, conservation needs, and proper animal husbandry.

My Life is a Zoo
My Life is a Zoo is a television show on National Geographic Wild cable station, filmed at the DeYoung Family Zoo. Neil Genzlinger of The New York Times wrote that DeYoung and Cramer "should be commended for their exotic-animal rescues and abundant enthusiasm but perhaps not for their hygiene," citing an occasion in the series in which Cramer is seen kissing a hyena on the lips.

References

External links 
 

Zoos in Michigan
1990 establishments in Michigan
Buildings and structures in Menominee County, Michigan
Tourist attractions in Menominee County, Michigan
Zoos established in 1990